James Edmondson, Sr. (June 10, 1910 – January 29, 1976), also known as Professor Backwards, was a vaudevillian/comedian who appeared on TV from the 1950s to the early 1970s, most notably on The Ed Sullivan Show, The Tonight Show, The Merv Griffin Show, The Dean Martin Show and The Mike Douglas Show, where he appeared more times than any other guest .  In addition to traditional stand-up comedy, Edmondson's act featured his ability to write in script that was upside down and/or backwards, spell and pronounce words backwards, and read an inverted blackboard correctly.

Quotes from the Professor Backwards act 

"I came down from Jacksonville on a train that was the slowest train I'd ever been on. I said to the conductor, 'Can't you run any faster?' He said, 'Yeah, but I gotta stay on the train.' A woman ran up to the conductor and said, 'Stop the train. I have to get to the maternity hospital.' He said, 'You had no business getting on the train in that condition.' She said, 'I didn't.'"

"I had a brand-new Mercury. I loaned it to my brother last week. I said, 'Treat it as if it was your own.' He sold it."

"I was walking in Manhattan the other day and a guy ran up to me and said, 'How do I get to the nearest hospital?' I told him, 'Just walk across Park Avenue with your eyes closed.'"

"I went up to the salesgirl. I said, 'I'd like to see something cheap in a man's suit.' She said, 'The mirror's on the left.'"

"What gets me is that estimated tax return. You have to guess how much you're gonna make. You have to fill it out, fix it up, sign it, send it in. I sent mine in last week. I didn't sign it. If I have to guess how much I'm gonna make, let them guess who sent it."

"You know what a stewardess is. That's a girl who asks you what you want, then straps you in the seat so you can't get it."

Murder
On January 28, 1976, Edmondson was dropped off at his home by Randall Koehl, his 16-year-old driver and friend, who lived next door.  Koehl then drove a woman in Edmondson's Cadillac Eldorado convertible to a house in East Point. Koehl stated that the woman was acting oddly. He stated he had never seen her before. After returning the car, he went home.

The next day, Edmondson was accosted at his College Park residence by three men, one of them armed with a pistol. After a demand for $5000, Edmondson produced a check for $300; afterwards, the gunman decided to wait overnight with Edmondson until the local bank opened, at which time, the intruders escorted Edmondson into his automobile and "drove around for an hour". When the car was stopped, three of the four men (including Edmondson) exited, and Edmondson was shot three times in the head, killing him. All three assailants were eventually arrested, charged with murder and armed robbery, convicted on both charges, and sentenced to life imprisonment.

Edmondson's death was satirized by Chevy Chase on Saturday Night Lives "Weekend Update" segment, two days after the shooting with a joke written by Michael O'Donoghue: "Well, the popular TV personality known as Professor Backwards was slain in Atlanta yesterday, by three masked gunmen.  According to reports, neighbors ignored the Professor's cries of 'Pleh! Pleh!' "

Trigger man Michael Gantt was paroled in May 2009, by the Georgia Department of Corrections.

References

External links

Packaging the Presidency, with a description of Edmondson's stand-up act
Appeal to reverse convictions in Professor Backwards murder case (1977)
Quotations from James Edmondson

American male comedians
20th-century American comedians
American entertainers
American television personalities
American murder victims
1910 births
1976 deaths
People from College Park, Georgia
People murdered in Georgia (U.S. state)
Deaths by firearm in Georgia (U.S. state)
 1976 murders in the United States